Laccophilinae is a subfamily of ground and water beetles in the family Dytiscidae. There are at least 410 described species in Laccophilinae.

Genera
 Africophilus Guignot, 1948
 Agabetes Crotch, 1873
 Australphilus Watts, 1978
 Japanolaccophilus Satô, 1972
 Laccodytes Régimbart, 1895
 Laccophilus Leach, 1815
 Laccoporus J. Balfour-Browne, 1939
 Laccosternus Brancucci, 1983
 Napodytes Steiner, 1981
 Neptosternus Sharp, 1882
 Philaccolilus Guignot, 1937
 Philaccolus Guignot, 1937
 Philodytes J. Balfour-Browne, 1939

References

 D.J. Larson, Y. Alarie, and R.E. Roughley. (2001). Predaceous Diving Beetles (Coleoptera: Dytiscidae) of the Nearctic Region, with emphasis on the fauna of Canada and Alaska. NRC 43253.
 Lawrence, J. F., and A. F. Newton Jr. / Pakaluk, James, and Stanislaw Adam Slipinski, eds. (1995). "Families and subfamilies of Coleoptera (with selected genera, notes, references and data on family-group names)". Biology, Phylogeny, and Classification of Coleoptera: Papers Celebrating the 80th Birthday of Roy A. Crowson, vol. 2, 779–1006.
 Nilsson, Anders N. (2001). World Catalogue of Insects, volume 3: Dytiscidae (Coleoptera), 395.

Further reading

 Arnett, R. H. Jr., and M. C. Thomas. (eds.). (21 December 2000) American Beetles, Volume I: Archostemata, Myxophaga, Adephaga, Polyphaga: Staphyliniformia. CRC Press LLC, Boca Raton, Florida. 
 Arnett, Ross H. (2000). American Insects: A Handbook of the Insects of America North of Mexico. CRC Press.
 Richard E. White. (1983). Peterson Field Guides: Beetles. Houghton Mifflin Company.

External links

 NCBI Taxonomy Browser, Laccophilinae

Dytiscidae
Beetle subfamilies